, also known as Mexico-Tenochtitlan,{{efn| ; {{lang-es|México-Tenochtitlan'}}}} was a large Mexican  in what is now the historic center of Mexico City. The exact date of the founding of the city is unclear. The date 13 March 1325 was chosen in 1925 to celebrate the 600th anniversary of the city. The city was built on an island in what was then Lake Texcoco in the Valley of Mexico. The city was the capital of the expanding Aztec Empire in the 15th century until it was captured by the Spanish in 1521.

At its peak, it was the largest city in the pre-Columbian Americas. It subsequently became a cabecera of the Viceroyalty of New Spain. The World Heritage Site of  contains what remains of the geography (water, boats, floating gardens) of the Mexica capital.

 was one of two Mexica  (city-states or polities) on the island, the other being . The city is located in modern-day Mexico City.

 Etymology 

However, one attestation in the late 16th-century manuscript known as "the Bancroft dialogues" suggest the second vowel was short, so that the true etymology remains uncertain. Another view is that the city was named after Tenoch.

Geography

 covered an estimated , situated on the western side of the shallow Lake Texcoco.

The city was connected to the mainland by bridges and causeways leading to the north, south, and west. The causeways were interrupted by bridges that allowed canoes and other water traffic to pass freely. The bridges could be pulled away, if necessary, to protect the city. The city was interlaced with a series of canals, so that all sections of the city could be visited either on foot or via canoe.

Lake  was the largest of five interconnected lakes. Since it formed in an endorheic basin, Lake  was brackish. Estimated to be  in length, the levee was completed circa 1453.

This was intended mainly for cleaning and washing. For drinking, water from mountain springs was preferred. Most of the population liked to bathe twice a day;  was said to take four baths a day. This was also popular in other Mesoamerican cultures.

City plans

Bernal Díaz del Castillo reported that they were wide enough for ten horses. Surrounding the raised causeways were artificial floating gardens with canal waterways and gardens of plants, shrubs, and trees. The calpullis were divided by channels used for transportation, with wood bridges that were removed at night.

The earliest European images of the city were woodcuts published in Augsburg around 1522.

Marketplaces

Each calpulli had its own  (marketplace), but there was also a main marketplace in  – 's sister city. Cortés estimated it was twice the size of the city of Salamanca with about 60,000 people trading daily. Bernardino de Sahagún provides a more conservative population estimate of 20,000 on ordinary days and 40,000 on feast days. There were also specialized markets in the other central Mexican cities.

Public buildings

In the center of the city were the public buildings, temples, and palaces. Inside a walled square,  to a side, was the ceremonial center.

Outside was the palace of Moctezuma with 100 rooms, each with its own bath, for the lords and ambassadors of allies and conquered people.

The city had great symmetry.

Palaces of Moctezuma II
The palace of Moctezuma II also had two houses or zoos, one for birds of prey and another for other birds, reptiles, and mammals. About 300 people were dedicated to the care of the animals.

There was also a botanical garden and an aquarium. The aquarium had ten ponds of salt water and ten ponds of fresh water, containing various fish and aquatic birds.

Social classes

Tenochtitlan can be considered the most complex society in Mesoamerica in regard to social stratification. The complex system involved many social classes. The  were commoners who lived outside the island city of Tenochtitlan. The  were noblemen who were relatives of leaders and former leaders, and lived in the confines of the island. , or eagle nobles, were commoners who impressed the nobles with their martial prowess, and were treated as nobles.  were the highest class, rulers of various parts of the empire, including the king.  were slaves or indentured servants. The membership of this class was based on heredity.   could become very rich because they did not pay taxes, but they had to sponsor the ritual feast of Xocotl Huetzi from the wealth that they obtained from their trade expeditions.

Status was displayed by the location and type of house where a person lived.  Ordinary people lived in houses made of reeds plastered with mud and roofed with thatch. People who were better off had houses of adobe brick with flat roofs. The wealthy had houses of stone masonry with flat roofs. They most likely made up the house complexes that were arranged around the inner court.  The higher officials in Tenochtitlan lived in the great palace complexes that made up the city.

These groups consist of both elite members of Aztec society and commoners. Elites provided commoners with arable land and nonagricultural occupations, and commoners performed services for chiefs and gave tribute.

History

Tenochtitlan was the capital of the Mexican civilization of the Mexica people, founded in 1325. The state religion of the Mexica civilization awaited the fulfillment of an ancient prophecy: the wandering tribes would find the destined site for a great city whose location would be signaled by an eagle with a snake in its beak perched atop a cactus (Opuntia), which had grown from the heart of Copil.

The Mexica saw this vision on what was then a small swampy island in Lake , a vision that is now immortalized in Mexico's coat of arms and on the Mexican flag. Not deterred by the unfavourable terrain, they set about building their city, using the  system (misnamed as "floating gardens") for agriculture and to dry and expand the island.

A thriving culture developed, and the Mexica civilization came to dominate other tribes around Mexico. The small natural island was perpetually enlarged as  grew to become the largest and most powerful city in Mesoamerica. Commercial routes were developed that brought goods from places as far as the Gulf of Mexico, the Pacific Ocean and perhaps even the Inca Empire.

Spanish conquistador Hernán Cortés arrived in Tenochtitlan on 8 November 1519. Although there are not precise numbers, the city's population has been estimated at between 200,000 and 400,000 inhabitants, placing Tenochtitlan among the largest cities in the world at that time. Compared to the cities of Europe, only Paris, Venice and Constantinople might have rivaled it. It was five times the size of the London of Henry VIII. In a letter to the Spanish king, Cortés wrote that  was as large as Seville or Córdoba. Cortes' men were in awe at the sight of the splendid city and many wondered if they were dreaming.

Although some popular sources put the number as high as 350,000, the most common estimates of the population are of over 200,000 people. It is also said that at one time, Moctezuma had rule over an empire of almost five million people in central and southern Mexico because he had extended his rule to surrounding territories to gain tribute and prisoners to sacrifice to the gods.

Conquest

When Cortés and his men invaded , Moctezuma II chose to welcome Cortés as an ambassador rather than risk a war which might quickly be joined by aggrieved indigenous people.

As Cortés approached , the  celebrated Toxcatl. The Spanish leader, Pedro de Alvarado, who was left in charge, worried that the natives planned a surprise attack. He captured three natives and tortured them until they said that this was indeed true. During the festival, the Spaniards came heavily armed and closed off every exit from the courtyard so that no one would escape. This happened during their last days in Tenochtitlan.

Nobles lined each side of the city's main causeway, which extended about a league. Cortés dismounted and was greeted by the ruler and his lords, but forbidden to touch him. Cortés gave him a necklace of crystals, placing it over his neck.

They were then brought to a large house that would serve as their home for their stay in the city. Once they were settled, Moctezuma himself sat down and spoke with Cortés. The great ruler declared that anything that they needed would be theirs to have. He was thrilled to have visitors of such stature.  Although the Spaniards were seeking gold, Moctezuma expressed that he had very little of the sort, but all of it was to be given to Cortés if he desired it.

He requested that officials be sent to him so that he could confirm his submission. To reach the province, the officers would have to travel through hostile land. The officer in charge of Vera Cruz decided to send four officers to meet with Qualpopoca.

When they arrived, they were captured and two were killed, the other two escaping through the woods. Upon their return to Vera Cruz, the officer in charge was infuriated, and led troops to storm Almería. Here they learned that Moctezuma was supposedly the one who ordered the officers executed. Though no serious conclusions were reached, this negatively affected the relationship between Moctezuma and the Spaniards.

Cortés subsequently besieged  for over 90 days, causing a famine. Having gained control, he then directed the systematic destruction and leveling of the city; and began its rebuilding, despite opposition. The reconstruction involved the creation of a central area designated for Spanish use (the traza). The outer Indian section, now dubbed San Juan Tenochtitlan, continued to be governed by the previous indigenous elite and was divided into the same subdivisions as before.

Symptoms were often delayed for up to ten days, when the infection would spread throughout the body, causing sores, pain, and high fever. People were weak to the point that they could not move, nor obtain food and water. Burial of the dead become difficult to impossible, due to the pervasiveness of the people's illness. The people of Tenochtitlan began to starve and weaken. The death toll rose steadily over the course of the next 60 days.

Colonial era

Cortés founded the Spanish capital of Mexico City on the ruins of Tenochtitlan. Despite the extensive damage to the built environment, the site retained symbolic power and legitimacy as the capital of the Aztec empire, which Cortés sought to appropriate. For a time this , the highest rank in the Spanish hierarchy of settlement designation, was called Mexico–Tenochtitlan. Charles Gibson devotes the final chapter of his classic work, The Aztecs Under Spanish Rule, to what he called "The City," with later historians building on his work. Although many native residents died during the siege of Tenochtitlan, the indigenous still had a strong presence in the city, and were settled in two main areas of the island, designated San Juan Tenochtitlan and Santiago Tlatelolco, each with a municipal council that functioned the entire colonial period. San Juan Tenochtitlan was a Spanish administrative creation, which amalgamated four indigenous sections, with each losing territory to the Spanish . In the colonial period both San Juan Tenochtitlan and Santiago Tlatelolco retained jurisdiction over settlements on the mainland that they could draw on for labor and tribute demanded by the Spanish, but increasingly those subordinate settlements were able to gain their autonomy with their own rulers and separate relationship with the Spanish rulers. Concern about the health of the indigenous population in early post-conquest Mexico–Tenochtitlan led to the founding of a royal hospital for indigenous residents.

There are a number of colonial-era pictorial manuscripts dealing with Tenochtitlan–Tlatelolco, which shed light on litigation between Spaniards and indigenous over property. Anthropologist Susan Kellogg has studied colonial-era inheritance patterns of Nahuas in Mexico City, using Nahuatl- and Spanish-language testaments.

Ruins

Tenochtitlan's main temple complex, the Templo Mayor, was dismantled and the central district of the Spanish colonial city was constructed on top of it. The great temple was destroyed by the Spanish during the construction of a cathedral. The location of the Templo Mayor was rediscovered in the early 20th century, but major excavations did not take place until 1978–1982, after utility workers came across a massive stone disc depicting the nude dismembered body of the moon goddess Coyolxauhqui.

The ruins, constructed over seven periods, were built on top of each other.  The resulting weight of the structures caused them to sink into the sediment of Lake Texcoco; the ruins now rest at an angle instead of horizontally.

Mexico City's Zócalo, the Plaza de la Constitución, is located at the site of Tenochtitlan's original central plaza and market, and many of the original calzadas still correspond to modern city streets. The Aztec calendar stone was located in the ruins. It was once located half-way up the great pyramid. This sculpture was carved around 1470 under the rule of King Axayacatl, the predecessor of Tizoc, and is said to tell the history of the Mexicas and to prophesy the future.

The burial dates back to the 1480s and lies at the foot of the main temple in the sacred ceremonial precinct of the Aztec capital. The bones are from children, teenagers and adults. A complete skeleton of a young woman was also found at the site.

See also
 List of megalithic sites
 List of Mesoamerican pyramids
 History of Mexico City

 Notes 

References

 
 
 
 
 
 
 
 
 Townsend, Camilla. Malintzin's Choices: An Indian Woman in the Conquest of Mexico. Albuquerque: University of New Mexico Press, 2006. Print.

Further reading

Calnek, Edward. "Settlement Pattern and Chinampa Agriculture at Tenochtitlan." American Antiquity 37.1. (1973) 190–95.
Calnek, Edward. "El sistema de mercado en Tenochtitlan." In Economía política e ideología en el México prehispánico. Eds. Pedro Carrasco and Johanna Broda, pp. 97–114. Mexico City: Centro de Investigaciones Superiores del Instituto de Antropología e Historia, 1978.
Calnek, Edward. "Tenochtitlan in the Early Colonial Period." Acts of the XLII International Congress of Americanists 8, 1976 (1979) 35–40.
Calnek, Edward. "Tenochtitlan-Tlatelolco: the Natural History of a City." In El Urbanismo en Mesoamérica/Urbanism in Mesoamerica, vol. 1. edited by W.T. Sanders et al., 149–202. Mexico City: Instituto Nacional de Antropología e Historia; University Park: Pennsylvania State University 2003.
Gibson, Charles. The Aztecs Under Spanish Rule. Stanford: Stanford University Press 1964. 

Mundy, Barbara E. "Mapping the Aztec Capital: the 1524 Nuremberg Map of Tenochtitlan, Its Sources and Meanings." Imago Mundi 50 (1998), 1–22.
Mundy, Barbara E. "Place-Names in Mexico-Tenochtitlan." Ethnohistory 61 (2) Spring 2014. 329–355.
Mundy, Barbara E. The Death of Aztec Tenochtitlan, the Life of Mexico City. Austin: University of Texas Press 2015.
Toussaint, Manuel, Federico Gómez de Orozco, and Justino Fernández, Planos de la Ciudad de México. XVI Congreso Internacional de Planificación y de la Habitación. Mexico City: Instituto de Investigaciones Estéticas de la Universidad Nacional Autónoma de México 1938.
Townsend, Richard F. State and Cosmos in the Art of Tenochtitlan''. Studies in Pre-Columbian Art and Archeology 20. Washington D.C., Dumbarton Oaks 1979.

External links

 
Aztec sites
Destroyed cities
Former populated places in Mexico
History of Mexico City
Lake islands of Mexico
Valley of Mexico
14th-century establishments in the Aztec civilization
Populated places established in the 1320s
Populated places disestablished in 1521
Artificial islands of Mexico
Razed cities
1521 disestablishments in North America
16th-century disestablishments in the Aztec civilization
Aztec Empire